Summer Discovery, officially known as Musiker Discovery Programs is an American company that runs pre-college and middle school enrichment programs worldwide.   The company is headquartered in Roslyn, New York.

History 
Summer Discovery was founded in 1966 when Mike and Judy Musiker founded Musiker Student Tours. Their sons, Bob and Jimmy Musiker, joined the organization in the early 1980s and assumed ownership in 1992. That year, the organization changed names from Musiker Student Tours, Inc. to Musiker Discovery Programs, Inc. to reflect the broad offerings available to students that now include pre-college enrichment, middle school enrichment, and gifted student programs.

The first Summer Discovery program began at UCLA in 1986, with locations and program offerings expanding tremendously since then. In 2009, Summer Discovery formed a partnership with Jeter's Leaders. The joint venture awards Jeter's Leaders scholarships to attend Summer Discovery programs at colleges and universities in the U.S.

In 2010, Summer Discovery partnered with Dream Careers to acquire Career Explorations and form Discovery Internships LLC. In 2020, Summer Discovery ceased offering its Discovery Internships program to focus more on pre-college programs worldwide.

In 2018, Summer Discovery was acquired by Verlinvest, which is now the majority owner of Summer Discovery. 

In 2020, Summer Discovery launched Summer Discovery Online in response to the worldwide COVID-19 pandemic. This program partners with universities to bring virtual, pre-college courses to students across the world.

In 2020, Summer Discovery acquired Summer Institute for the Gifted (SIG). Through Summer Institute for the Gifted (SIG), Summer Discovery provides academic summer programs for gifted, academically talented, and creative students ages 5–17.

Student Tours
The ‘Discover America’ student tour started in 1967, the European program in 1969, the camping program in 1983, the ‘Alaskan Hawaii’ program in 1986.

In the fall of 2008, Summer Discovery ceased offering student tours.

Academic programs
Summer Discovery Educational Programs began in 1986 on the campus of UCLA. Two years later Summer Discovery at Cambridge University in England was introduced.  Since 1989, the campuses of the University of Michigan, Georgetown University, University of California at Santa Barbara, University of Colorado Boulder, the University of Texas at Austin, University of Pennsylvania, the Wharton School, Hult International Business School in London,  Istituto Lorenzo de’Medici in Italy, Shanghai Jiao Tong University in China, Yale-NUS College in Singapore,  have been a part of he Summer Discovery campus options.

Past Programs

Discovery Internships
Discovery Internships is a tuition-based, all-inclusive 4 week customized internship program for high school students. Discovery Interns live in residence halls with other students from around the world while exploring a career of interest through an internship. T.

College Discovery
The Princeton Review College Discovery Experience is designed to help students choose the college that is best suited for them. During the 2 week summer program, students develop their knowledge of various schools through campus visits and tours run by the school’s admissions office, improve their SAT scores through the Princeton Review SAT Preparation course, and create a personal college admissions profile which includes an application essay.

DiscoveryWorks
DiscoveryWorks is a community service program in collaboration with Summer Discovery.

Current Programs

Summer Discovery
Summer Discovery offers 2 – 6 week pre-college enrichment programs for high school students. Students live in a university residence hall while taking courses taught by university professors. The programs provide access to over 300 courses. Summer Discovery also offers commuter options at select universities.

Junior Discovery 
Jr. Discovery is a 3-week summer enrichment experience for middle school students completing grades 6, 7 and 8. This program is offered at UCLA and Georgetown.

Summer Discovery Online 
Summer Discovery Online partners with universities to provide virtual, pre-college courses. Students also have access to a virtual community throughout the program.

Summer Institute for the Gifted 
In addition, Summer Discovery offers gifted academic summer programs through Summer Institute for the Gifted (SIG).

References

United States educational programs